The National Security Council (NSC) (IAST: Rāṣṭrīya Surakṣā Pariṣad) of India is an executive government agency tasked with advising the Prime Minister's Office on matters of national security and strategic interest. It was established by the former Prime Minister of India Atal Bihari Vajpayee on 19 November 1998, with Brajesh Mishra as the first National Security Advisor. Prior to the formation of the NSC, these activities were overseen by the Principal Secretary to the preceding Prime Minister.

Members
Besides the National Security Advisor (NSA), Chief of Defence Staff (CDS), the Deputy National Security Advisors, the Ministers of Defence, External Affairs, Home, Finance of the Government of India, and the Vice Chairman of the NITI Aayog are members of the National Security Council. PM can chair the meeting of NSC (for eg - PM chaired the meeting of NSC Post Pulwama to discuss heightened tension with Pakistan). Other members may be invited to attend its monthly meetings, as and when it is required.

Organisational structure
The NSC is the apex body of the three-tiered structure of the national security management system in India. The three tiers are the Strategic Policy Group, the National Security Advisory Board and a secretariat from the Joint Intelligence Committee.

Strategic Policy Group
The Strategic Policy Group is the first level of the three tier structure of the National Security Council. It forms the nucleus of the decision-making apparatus of the NSC. National Security Advisor Ajit Doval is the chairman of the group and it consists of the following members:
Vice Chairman Niti Aayog (Suman Bery)
Cabinet Secretary (Rajiv Gauba, IAS)
Chief of Defence Staff (General Anil Chauhan)
Chief of the Army Staff (General Manoj Pande)
Chief of the Naval Staff (Admiral R. Hari Kumar) 
Chief of the Air Staff (Air Chief Marshal Vivek Ram Chaudhari)
Governor, Reserve Bank of India (Shaktikanta Das)
Foreign Secretary (Vinay Mohan Kwatra, IFS)
Defence Secretary (Giridhar Aramane, IAS)
Home Secretary (Ajay Kumar Bhalla, IAS)
Finance Secretary (T. V. Somanathan, IAS)
Secretary (Research) (Samant Goel, IPS)
 Director General, Defence Intelligence Agency (Lieutenant General G. A. V. Reddy) 
Director, Intelligence Bureau (Tapan Deka, IPS)
Chairperson, Central Board of Direct Taxes (Pramod Chandra Mody, IRS (IT))
Secretary (Defence Production) (Giridhar Aramane, IAS)
 Scientific Advisor to the Raksha Mantri (Dr. G. Satheesh Reddy)
 Chairman of Defence Research and Development Organisation (Dr. Samir V. Kamat)
Secretary (Atomic Energy) (Dr. K. N. Vyas)
 Secretary (Space) and ex-officio Chairman, Indian Space Research Organization (Dr. S. Somanath)

The Strategic Policy Group undertakes the Strategic Defence Review, a blueprint of short and long term security threats, as well as possible policy options on a priority basis.

National Security Advisory Board
The brainchild of the first National Security Advisor (NSA), Brajesh Mishra, a former member of Indian Foreign Service. The National Security Advisory Board (NSAB) consists of a group of eminent national security experts outside of the government. Members are usually senior retired officials, civilian as well as military, academics and distinguished members of civil society drawn from and having expertise in Internal and External Security, Foreign Affairs, Defence, Science & Technology and Economic Affairs.

The first NSAB, constituted in December 1998, headed by the late K. Subrahmanyam produced a draft Nuclear Doctrine for the country in 2001, a Strategic Defence Review in 2002 and a National Security Review in 2007.

The board meets at least once a month, and more frequently as required. It provides a long-term prognosis and analysis to the NSC and recommends solutions and address policy issues referred to it. Initially the Board was constituted for one year, but since 2004-06, the Board has been reconstituted for two years.

The tenure of the previous NSAB, headed by former Foreign Secretary Shyam Saran, ended in January 2015. It had 14 members.

The new board has been re-constituted in July 2018, with P. S. Raghavan, former Indian Ambassador to Russia (2014–16), as its head. It has a tenure of two years.

Currently the board has the following members:-

Joint Intelligence Committee
The Joint Intelligence Committee (JIC) of the Government of India analyses intelligence data from the Intelligence Bureau, Research and Analysis Wing and the Directorates of Military, Naval and Air Intelligence and thus analyses both domestic and foreign intelligence. The JIC has its own Secretariat that works under the Cabinet Secretariat.

Cyber Security 
National Cyber Security Strategy is formulated by the Office of National Cyber Security Coordinator at the National Security Council Secretariat. The National Security Council and National Information Board headed by National Security Adviser are at working under the cyber security surveillance helping in framing India’s cyber security policy. It aims to protect the cyber space including critical information infrastructure from attack, damage, misuse and economic espionage.

In 2014 the National Critical Information Infrastructure Protection Centre under the National Technical Research Organisation mandated the protection of critical information infrastructure. In 2015, the Office of National Cyber Security Coordinator was created to advice the Prime Minister on strategic cyber security issues. In the case of nodal entity, India’s Computer Emergency Response Team (CERT-in) is playing a crucial role under the Ministry of Electronics and Information Technology(MEITY).

On 15 June 2021, the Government of India launched the Trusted Telecom Portal signalling the coming into effect of the National Security Directive on Telecommunication Sector (NSDTS). Consequently, with effect from 15 June 2021 the Telecom Service Providers (TSPs) are mandatorily required to connect in their networks only those new devices which are designated as Trusted Products from Trusted Sources.

See also

 Cabinet Committee on Security
 List of Indian Intelligence agencies

References

External links

 Official website of the National Security Advisory Board
Trusted Telecom Portal - National Security Directive on Telecommunication Sector
 Center for Contemporary Conflict - Indian Internal Security and Intelligence Organization
 Espionage Info - India, Intelligence and Security
 FAS - Directorate for Inter-Services Intelligence
 Global Security - India Intelligence and Security Agencies

India
Councils of India
Security
1998 establishments in Delhi
Government agencies established in 1998
Ministry of Communications and Information Technology (India)
Cyber Security in India